Picketts Valley is a semi-rural suburb of the Central Coast region of New South Wales, Australia. It is in the  local government area.

References

Suburbs of the Central Coast (New South Wales)